Vrezh Kirakosyan (in Armenian Վրեժ Կիրակոսյան) (born in 1983) is an Armenian singer who won the first series (2010–2011) of the Armenian X-Factor series (in Armenian Իքս-Ֆակտոր) after getting top votes in the final broadcast live on the Armenian Shant TV station on 15 May 2011, against rival finalist and runner-up Srbuhi Sargsyan.

Title holder Kirakosyan competed in the "over 25" category and was mentored by judge Gisané Palyan. As a result of his victory, he has a contract with Sony for two singles in addition to filming of a music video for his winning song.

References

21st-century Armenian male singers
1983 births
Living people
The X Factor winners